In five-dimensional geometry, a steric 5-cube or (steric 5-demicube or sterihalf 5-cube) is a convex uniform 5-polytope. There are unique 4 steric forms of the 5-cube. Steric 5-cubes have half the vertices of stericated 5-cubes.

Steric 5-cube

Alternate names 
 Steric penteract, runcinated demipenteract
 Small prismated hemipenteract (siphin) (Jonathan Bowers)

Cartesian coordinates 
The Cartesian coordinates for the 80 vertices of a steric 5-cube centered at the origin are the permutations of
 (±1,±1,±1,±1,±3)
with an odd number of plus signs.

Images

Related polytopes

Stericantic 5-cube

Alternate names 
 Prismatotruncated hemipenteract (pithin) (Jonathan Bowers)

Cartesian coordinates 
The Cartesian coordinates for the 480 vertices of a stericantic 5-cube centered at the origin are coordinate permutations:
 (±1,±1,±3,±3,±5)
with an odd number of plus signs.

Images

Steriruncic 5-cube

Alternate names 
 Prismatorhombated hemipenteract (pirhin) (Jonathan Bowers)

Cartesian coordinates 
The Cartesian coordinates for the 320 vertices of a steriruncic 5-cube centered at the origin are coordinate permutations:
 (±1,±1,±1,±3,±5)
with an odd number of plus signs.

Images

Steriruncicantic 5-cube

Alternate names 
 Great prismated hemipenteract (giphin) (Jonathan Bowers)

Cartesian coordinates 
The Cartesian coordinates for the 960 vertices of a steriruncicantic 5-cube centered at the origin are coordinate permutations:
 (±1,±1,±3,±5,±7)
with an odd number of plus signs.

Images

Related polytopes 

This polytope is based on the 5-demicube, a part of a dimensional family of uniform polytopes called demihypercubes for being alternation of the hypercube family.

There are 23 uniform polytera (uniform 5-polytope) that can be constructed from the D symmetry of the 5-demicube, of which are unique to this family, and 15 are shared within the 5-cube family.

References

Further reading

External links 
 
 Polytopes of Various Dimensions
 Multi-dimensional Glossary

5-polytopes